Cibak may be,

Cibak language

People
Martin Cibák
Peter Cibák
Vladimír Cibák